Michael Kozoll is an American screenwriter. He is perhaps best known for creating the police procedural television series Hill Street Blues along with Steven Bochco. Kozoll wrote for television programs including Delvecchio, Quincy, M.E., McCloud, Richie Brockelman, Private Eye and Kolchak: The Night Stalker. He won two Primetime Emmy Awards, and was nominated for two more, in the category Outstanding Writing for a Drama Series for his work on Hill Street Blues. In 1981 he
won an Emmy for Outstanding Drama Series, along with Bochco and Gregory Hoblit.

Selected filmography 
 First Blood (1982)
 The Hard Way (1991)

References

External links 

Living people
Place of birth missing (living people)
Year of birth missing (living people)
American television writers
American male television writers
American male screenwriters
20th-century American male writers
20th-century American screenwriters
Primetime Emmy Award winners
Writers Guild of America Award winners
Showrunners